Lea Meyer (born 16 September 1997) is a German athlete, specializing in 3000 metres steeplechase . She won a silver medal in steeplechase at 2022 European Championships in Munich. Prior, she competed in the women's 3000 metres event at the 2021 European Athletics Indoor Championships.

References

External links

1997 births
Living people
German female middle-distance runners
Place of birth missing (living people)
Athletes (track and field) at the 2020 Summer Olympics
Olympic athletes of Germany
European Athletics Championships medalists
21st-century German women